Radhica is a genus of moths in the family Lasiocampidae. The genus was erected by Moore in 1879.

Selected species
Radhica elisabethae de Lajonquière, 1977
Radhica flavovittata Moore, 1879
Radhica himerta (Swinhoe, 1893)
Radhica holoxantha (Grünberg, 1913)
Radhica rosea Hampson, 1891
Radhica vasilissae Zolotuhin & Sinyaev, 2009

References

Lasiocampidae